Kiszombor is a more than 800 years old village in Csongrád County, in the Southern Great Plain region of southern Hungary.

Geography
It is an agricultural village, near the Maros River.

There is a border-crossing point into Romania near the village, where the first village is Cenad.

There is a village-festival on the third weekend of September every year. A number of Hungarian artists appear, play, sing, dance and so on.

Sightseeing for visitors
In the village a number of old architectural heritage from the Romanesque art to Romantic art can be seen.

Churches
Rotunda (Szent István tér)

The rotunda was built in the 12th century with a circular ground plan outside and with sixfold arched inside. There are only 3 such churches in Europe, all 3 in the late Kingdom of Hungary (and in the Carpathian Basin), in the east part of it: Kiszombor, Gerény and Karcsa. Relatives of this rotunda-type could be found in the Caucasus. The frescos were painted in the 14th century and 18th century. In 1776 a rectangular church was attached to the rotunda, later in 1910 a big Roman Catholic Church was attached to it, the rotunda used to be their chapel.

Roman Catholic Church

It was built in Neoromanesque art in 1910 after demolishing the old church in Baroque art.

Mansion
Rónay Castle (Móricz Zsigmond u. 1–3.)

It was built in Romantic art around 1858. There is a 3-storey rampart-like tower on the short west side. Its park and the original interior was destroyed during the Communism in Hungary.

Rónay Mansion (Aladár Mansion) (Szegedi u. 1/B)

The mansion was built in the 1860's in Classical art. Its designer is unknown.
The building was restored in 2005, showing its old beauty, and operates as a restaurant under the name Rónay kúria.

Rónay Mansion (Tibor Mansion) (Szent István tér 2.)

Granary
Granary with portico (Óbébai u. 2.)

The building in Classical art was built around 1835. This granary designed and constructed with style is unique in Hungary.

References
 Aradi N. (Ed.): A művészet története Magyarországon. (The History of Arts in Hungary). Gondolat, Budapest 
 Fülep L. (Ed.): A magyarországi művészet története. (The History of the Hungarian Arts). Budapest 
 Gerevich T.: Magyarország románkori emlékei. (Die romanische Denkmäler Ungarns.) Egyetemi nyomda. Budapest, 1938.
 Gerő L. : Magyar műemléki ABC. Budapest, 1984
 Gervers-Molnár, V. (1972): A középkori Magyarország rotundái. (Rotunda in the Medieval Hungary). Akadémiai, Budapest
 Henszlmann, I. (1876): Magyarország ó-keresztyén, román és átmeneti stylü mű-emlékeinek rövid ismertetése, (Old-Christian, Romanesque and Transitional Style Architecture in Hungary). Királyi Magyar Egyetemi Nyomda, Budapest
 Marosi E.: A román kor művészete, (Art of the Romanesque Ages). Corvina, Budapest, 1972, 
 Szilágyi A. (2008): A Kárpát-medence Árpád-kori rotundái és centrális templomai. (The Rotunda and Central Building Churches in the Carpathian Basin.) Semmelweis Kiadó, Budapest

External links

  in Hungarian
 Restaurant Rónay kúria

Populated places in Csongrád-Csanád County
Romanesque architecture in Hungary
Hungary–Romania border crossings